The Karachi Dock Labour Board (KDLB) is responsible for labour relations between employees and the Karachi Port Trust.  The KDLB was formed in 1973 to provide dock workers with a rotational system of employment at the docks.  In 2006, the World Bank recommended closing the KDLB as part of an overhaul of the Karachi Port operations.

See also 
 Karachi Port Trust

References 

Port of Karachi
Labour in Pakistan
Trade unions established in 1973